The  are a professional baseball team in Japan's Pacific League based in Chiba City, Chiba Prefecture, in the Kantō region, and owned by Lotte Holdings Co., Ltd.. Since 1992, the Marines' home ballpark has been ZOZO Marine Stadium, located in the Mihama Ward of Chiba, seating 30,118 people.

The "Marines" name originates from the name of the stadium they play in, which is officially named Chiba Marine Stadium, because the stadium is located right on the water.

Through 2022, the franchise's all-time record is 4733-4701-394 (.501).

History
The Marines franchise began in 1950 as the Mainichi Orions, an inaugural member of the Pacific League. The Orions were named after the constellation of the same name. The Marines won the inaugural Japan Series in 1950.

In 1958, the team was merged with the Daiei Unions and renamed the Daimai Orions. In 1964 they became the Tokyo Orions, and the Lotte Orions in 1969. The franchise was slow to replicate its initial success: the Orions made the Japan Series in 1960 and 1970, only to lose both years.

The team played in central Tokyo until 1972. From 1973 to 1977 the Lotte Orions played in the northern Japanese city of Sendai. In 1974, they beat the Chunichi Dragons, becoming the first Pacific League team to win the Series in ten years, as the Yomiuri Giants had claimed the prior nine titles behind the Oh–Nagashima attack. After beating the Dragons, their owners, Lotte Holdings, decided to hold their victory parade in Tokyo, which shocked fans in Sendai. This eventually caused their attendance there to crash, from sold out games in 1973, to only about 2000-3000 for their last few years in Sendai.

In 1977, the Orions signed Major League Baseball player Leron Lee, who ended up playing for the team for eleven seasons, compiling a .320 career batting average and slugging 283 home runs with 912 career RBI. From his retirement to early 2018 (when surpassed by Norichika Aoki), Lee held the Japanese record for career batting average (players with more than 4,000 at bats). In 1978, Lee invited younger brother Leon Lee to play in Japan, and the brothers formed a feared cleanup for the Orions for five seasons — in 1980, Leron had 33 home runs, 90 RBI, and a batting average of .358; while Leon slugged 41 home runs and drove in 116 runs, with a batting average of .340.

In 1978 the team returned to the Tokyo area, settling in Kawasaki's Kawasaki Stadium, at one time home to the Taiyo Whales (today's Yokohama DeNA Baystars).

In 1992, the team moved to Chiba City's Chiba Marine Stadium on the eastern shore of Tokyo Bay and were renamed the Chiba Lotte Marines. They were named the Marines (although they held a fan vote, and Dolphins won, and Pirates was a popular choice, Dolphins was out, even though the Nagoya Dolphins were long dead, the letter "D" in broadcasts was already taken by the Dragons, while "M" was available, and the Chiba Pirates name was used by a team in a baseball manga, and since the team in that manga is terrible, executives thought it would look bad on the real team) because they stated that "Marines" meant "heroes of the sea". Originally, the club used pink, blue, and white on their logo, which included a pirate ship, with a seagull below it, and a wave pattern to reflect the ocean currents off Chiba's coast. In 1995, this was changed to the logo's current design, while dropping pink and blue in favor of red, black and white (with red being dropped in 2019). The current logo's design features a baseball in the background with a seagull soaring, with the club's name around the circle.

The team failed to reach the Japan Series again until 2005. The Marines started the 2005 season in first place behind American manager Bobby Valentine, but fell behind the Fukuoka SoftBank Hawks as the year progressed. Under the playoff format of the time, the preliminary  five-game playoff round, prior to the Japan Series, saw the teams with the best first and second half records face off. The Marines defeated the Hawks three games to two in the Pacific League championship, winning the rubber match despite entering the eighth inning trailing, 2–1.

The Marines thus qualified for the Japan Series, the first time they had reached the tournament since 1974, a 31-year drought. In a one-sided series, the Marines swept the Hanshin Tigers in four games, scoring ten runs in each of the first three games.  The apparent ease with which the Marines defeated the Tigers added fuel to the ongoing debate concerning the need for a playoff system in the Central League, which was finally added in 2007 (see Climax Series). The Marines went on to defeat South Korea's Samsung Lions in the final round of the Konami Cup Championships.

In 2010, the Marines clinched third place on the last day of the season to earn a berth into the Climax Series. They went on to become the first third place team to ever win the Climax Series, and faced off with the Chunichi Dragons in the 2010 Japan Series. The Marines defeated the Dragons in seven games, composed of four wins, two losses, and one tie, winning their second Japan Series in under ten years.

In 2013, the Marines clinched third place to clinch a berth in the Climax Series and faced the Saitama Seibu Lions in the first stage. They defeated the Lions in 3 games to move onto the final stage. They would lose to the Tohoku Rakuten Golden Eagles in 5 games, who would go on and defeat the Yomiuri Giants in 7 games to win their first (and still only) Japan Series title.

They would make it back in the playoffs in 2015. They defeated the Hokkaido Nippon-Ham Fighters in 3 games in the first round, then got swept by the Fukuoka SoftBank Hawks, who received a one game advantage for having the best record in the Pacific League.

The following season, they returned to the playoffs. They would make a much earlier exit, as they were swept by the Hawks in 2 games in the first stage.

It would not be until 2020 when they returned to the playoffs. The Hawks, with a 1 game advantage, would sweep them again in the first stage.

They bounced back the following year by defeating the Eagles in 2 games in the first stage, including a tie in the second game which allowed them to advance as they had the better record at 67-57-19, while the Eagles had a 66-62-15 record. They got swept by the Orix Buffaloes in the final stage in 3 games, however a tie in the third game and Orix having the better record at 70-55-18, allowed the Buffaloes to advance.

On April 10, 2022,  Rōki Sasaki threw a perfect game, NPB's first in 28 years and the 16th in NPB history. Sasaki tied an existing NPB record by striking out 19 batters, and setting a new record by striking out 13 consecutive batters.

Current roster

Notable former players

  Benny Agbayani
  Hiromitsu Ochiai
  Alfredo Despaigne
  Mike Diaz 
  Jose Fernández
  Julio Franco
  Matt Franco
  Mel Hall
  Isao Harimoto
  Baek In-chun
  Pete Incaviglia
  Hideki Irabu 
  Kazuya Fukuura (retired in 2019)
  Masaaki Kitaru
  Kiyoshi Hatsushiba 
  Masahide Kobayashi 
  Tsuyoshi Nishioka 
  Satoru Komiyama (retired in 2009)
  Bill Madlock
  Leon Lee (father of Derrek Lee)
  Leron Lee (uncle of Derrek Lee)
  Choji Murata (elected to Japanese Baseball Hall of Fame in 2005) 
  Jim Lefebvre
  Darryl Motley
  Bill R.W. Murphy
  Yuhei Nakaushiro  
  Katsuo So
  Kazuhiro Yamauchi 
  Akihito Igarashi 
  Michiyo Arito
  Saburo (retired in 2016)
  Tomohiro Kuroki (also name as "Johnny Kuroki")
  Tomoya Satozaki (retired in 2014)
  Dan Serafini
  Lee Seung-yuop
  Naoyuki Shimizu (traded to Yokohama BayStars in 2009)
  Kim Tae-kyun
  Norifumi Nishimura
  Shunsuke Watanabe
  Julio Zuleta
  Frank Bolick
  Derrick May
  Rick Short
  Brian Sikorski
  José Castillo
  Chen Kuan-yu
  Wei-Yin Chen
  Luis Cruz
  Toshihide Narimoto 
  Makoto Kosaka
  Koichi Hori
  Adeiny Hechavarria
  Leonys Martín
  Hiroyuki Yamazaki
  Yukinaga Maeda
  Kazuhiko Ushijima
  Tadahito Iguchi
  Hideaki Takazawa 
  Kihachi Enomoto
  Eric Hillman

MLB players

Retired: 
Hideki Irabu (1997–2002) 
Masato Yoshii (1998–2002) 
Satoru Komiyama (2002)
Tadahito Iguchi (2005–2008)
Masahide Kobayashi (2008–2009)
Tsuyoshi Nishioka (2011–2012)
Ryohei Tanaka (2009–2011)
Yasuhiko Yabuta (2008–2009)
Shunsuke Watanabe (2014)
Yuhei Nakaushiro (2016–2018) 
Hirokazu Sawamura (2021–2022)

Honored number

 26 – This number was retired in honor of the Marines' fans in 2005. It was inspired by some teams in other sports (such as football, which retires "12" for the "12th man", or basketball, which retires "6" for the "6th man").The Tohoku Rakuten Golden Eagles has the No. 10 retired in similar fashion. MLB's Los Angeles Angels has retired No. 26, in same fashion, for the founder Gene Autry.

Managers 

 Statistics current through the end of the  season.

Cheer Dancers 
The Marines' cheer dancing squad is known as M☆Splash!!. They were formed in 2004. Alongside the team's mascots Mar-kun, Rine-chan and Zu-chan, they entertain the crowd during Marines games, with 27 members.

Mascots
Mar-kun (マーくん, Maa-kun) is a main mascot character of the Marines. With his girlfriend Rine-chan (リーンちゃん, Riin-chan) and his young brother Zu-chan (ズーちゃん, Zuu-chan), he entertains spectators at team games. Their name is a separateness of the team name. Originally Rine-chan wore a pink sports visor cap till the 2022 season when she wore the same baseball cap as her boyfriend while retaining the skirt, while Zu-chan wears the cap backwards and wears an apron instead of the jersey beginning 2022, before that he wore a shirt unless all three wear their team's special home uniforms.

Mysterious fish (謎の魚, Nazo-no-sakana) was a mascot character that was introduced in May 2017. He is a weird fish with legs. He has collaborated with Hawaiian Airlines that former Marines' player Benny Agbayani works for, since 2018. However, the person playing the mascot announced after the 2021 season that he would retire, which also meant the mascot was officially retired.

Back when the team were known as the "Lotte Orions", their mascot was a character known simply as Bubble-Boy (バブル坊や, Bable-Boya) who only appeared as a logo.

In 2005, the Marines introduced a mascot named Cool-kun ( かっこいいくん, Kakkoi-kun), a penguin who was known for his acrobatic stunts and would often challenge mascots like Doala and B.B to acrobatic stunt contests at rival games. He also would be stuck up and rude at times, but he would burst to tears or show great emotion at the right time. Despite being friends with Mar-kun, they do not get along very well. In 2016, he was retired by the team.

Minor League Team 
The Marines farm team plays in the Eastern League. The team was founded as the Mainichi Glitter Orions in 1950.

See also
 Lotte Giants
 Lotte Group

References

External links
 Chiba Lotte Marines official website 
 We Love Marines – English-language Marines fansite

 
Lotte Corporation
Sports teams in Chiba Prefecture
Nippon Professional Baseball teams
1950 establishments in Japan
Baseball teams established in 1950